Sir George Francis Osborne, 16th Baronet,  (27 July 1894 – 21 July 1960) was an Anglo-Irish baronet and British Army officer. He was decorated for gallantry during the First World War.

Biography

Osborne was born on 27 July 1894. He was the eldest son of Sir Francis Osborne, 15th Baronet and wife Kathleen Eliza née Whitfield, of Framfield Grange, Sussex.

Osborne was educated at Repton School, Derbyshire before entering the Royal Military Academy Sandhurst, Berkshire.

Career
Osborne fought with distinction in the First World War, receiving mentions in despatches.

Wounded in combat twice, Osborne was awarded the Military Cross in 1917 and was promoted major in 1932 before retiring from regular service with the Royal Sussex Regiment in the rank of lieutenant-colonel.

Osborne succeeded to the family title, the Osborne Baronetcy of Ballentaylor and Ballylemonon, on 23 October 1948.

Personal life and death
Osborne married on 27 February 1938 Mary Grace Horn (1903–1987), daughter of Clement Samuel Horn (1871–1946) of Goring-by-Sea, Worthing, West Sussex, Sussex, and Juliet Ivy Horn née Sceales (1881–1969). Mary Grace had previously been married, before 1926, to Dr. Robert Stavali Aspinall, a British Army surgeon, by whom she had had a son, John Victor Aspinall.

Mary Grace and Osborne had four children:
 Jennifer Jane Osborne (29 March 1939 – 8 September 2022), married on 20 May 1966 Antony Rufus Little
 Caroline Mary Osborne (b. 12 November 1941), married before 1966 Michael J. Dodd,  (issue).
 Sir Peter Osborne, 17th Baronet of Vinnicks, Highclere, Hampshire, 17th Baronet (b. 29 June 1943) married on 16 October 1968 Felicity Alexandra Loxton-Peacock of Belgravia, London (who married subsequently in 1979 Sir Anthony Grover, Chairman of Lloyd's Register of Shipping, who died in 1981, and married thirdly in 1983 Sir James Dunnett,) and had four children:
 The Rt. Hon. George Gideon Oliver Osborne (b. 23 May 1971)
 Benedict George Osborne (b. 25 July 1973)
 Adam Peter Osborne (b. 25 March 1976)
 Theodore "Theo" Grantley Osborne (b. 28 March 1985)
 James Francis Osborne (b. 18 February 1946), educated at Seaford College, Petworth, West Sussex, Sussex, and at the Sorbonne University, Paris, married on 9 October 1971 Felicity Jane Boutwood, daughter of Peter Boutwood of West Wittering, Chichester, West Sussex, Sussex, and adopted two sons and had one son:
 (adopted) Toby James Robert Osborne (b. 1977), twin with the below
 (adopted) George Dominic Peter Osborne (b. 1977), twin with the above
 Harry Lucas Osborne (b. 1988)

Osborne died on 21 July 1960.

References

Sources
 Charles Mosley, editor, Burke's Peerage, Baronetage & Knightage, 107th edition, 3 volumes (Wilmington, Delaware, U.S.A.: Burke's Peerage (Genealogical Books) Ltd, 2003), volume 2, pages 3031 and 3032.

External links

 http://www.thepeerage.com/p31486.htm#i314853

1894 births
20th-century Anglo-Irish people
People educated at Repton School
Recipients of the Military Cross
1960 deaths
Osborne baronets
Royal Sussex Regiment officers
British Army personnel of World War I